Volbeat is a Danish rock band formed in Copenhagen in 2001. As of 2015, their formation consists of vocalist and guitarist Michael Poulsen, guitarist Rob Caggiano, bassist Anders Kjølholm and drummer Jon Larsen. The band has released three studio albums, six singles, one DVD and two demos.

They have received ten nominations for the Danish Metal Awards and won three trophies. Volbeat also received four nominations for the Danish Music Awards but went home empty handed. They also won a Steppeulv award in 2006, a P3 Guld award in 2007 and a Zulu Award in 2008.

Danish Metal Awards 
The Danish Metal Awards is an annual awards ceremony established in 2004 by various Danish metal magazines and TV shows. Volbeat have received five awards from sixteen nominations.

|-
| 2004
| Volbeat
| Best live act
| 
|-
|align="center" rowspan="4"| 2005
|rowspan="3"| The Strength / The Sound / The Songs
| Metal album of the year
| 
|-
| Metal debut album of the year
| 
|-
| Metal album cover of the year
| 
|-
| Volbeat
| Metal live band of the year
| 
|-
|align="center"| 2006
| Volbeat
| Metal live band of the year
| 
|-
|align="center" rowspan="5"| 2007
|rowspan="3"| Rock the Rebel / Metal the Devil
| Metal album of the year
| 
|-
| Metal production of the year
| 
|-
| Metal album cover of the year
| 
|-
| Radio Girl
| Metal music video of the year
| 
|-
| Volbeat
| Metal live band of the year
| 
|-
|align="center" rowspan="4"|2008
|rowspan="3"| Guitar Gangsters & Cadillac Blood
| Metal album of the year
| 
|-
| Metal production of the year
| 
|-
| Metal album cover of the year
| 
|-
| Maybellene i Hofteholder
| Metal video of the year
| 
|-
| 2009
| We
| Metal video of the year
| 
|}

Danish Music Awards 
The Danish Music Awards is an annual awards ceremony established in 1989 by the Danish department of the IFPI. Volbeat received five nominations but failed to win an award.

|-
|align="center" rowspan="4"| 2008
|rowspan="2"| Rock the Rebel / Metal the Devil
| Best Danish album of the year
| 
|-
| Best Danish rock album of the year
| 
|-
| Volbeat
| Best Danish band of the year
| 
|-
| Michael Poulsen
| Best singer
| 
|-
|rowspan="2"|2009
| Volbeat
| Best Danish band of the year
| 
|-
| Guitar Gangsters & Cadillac Blood
| Best Danish Rock Album
|
|-
|rowspan="2"|2013
| Volbeat
| Best Danish band of the year
| 
|-
| Outlaw Gentlemen & Shady Ladies
| Best Danish Rock Album
|
|}

Grammy Awards 
The Grammy Awards are awarded annually by the National Academy of Recording Arts and Sciences in the United States. Volbeat were nominated for Best Metal Performance.

|-
| 2014
| "Room 24"
| Best Metal Performance
| 
|}

iHeartRadio Music Awards 

|-
|rowspan=2|2017
|Volbeat
|Rock Artist of the Year
|
|-
|"The Devil's Bleeding Crown"
|Rock Song of the Year
|
|}

MTV Europe Music Awards 
The MTV Europe Music Awards is an annual awards ceremony established in 1994 by MTV Europe. Volbeat were nominated as Best Danish act.

|-
| 2007
| Best Danish act
| Volbeat
| 
|-
| 2008
| Best Danish act
| Volbeat
| 
|}

P3 Guld 
P3 Guld is an annual award ceremony established by the Danish radio station DR P3. Volbeat have won two award.

|-
| 2007
| Listener's Favourite of the Year
| The Garden's Tale
| 
|-
| 2008
| Listener's Favourite of the Year
| Maybellene i Hofteholder
| 
|-
| 2011
| Listener's Favourite of the Year
| "Fallen"
| 
|-
| 2016
| Listener's Favourite of the Year
| "For Evigt"
| 
|}

Steppeulven 
The Steppeulven is an annual award ceremony established by the Association of Danish Music Critics. Volbeat have won one award out of four nominations.

|-
| rowspan="3"| 2006
| Volbeat
| Hope of the year
| 
|-
| rowspan="2"| Michael Poulsen
| Singer of the year
| 
|-
| Composer of the year
| 
|-
| 2009
| Volbeat
| Band of the year
| 
|}

Zulu Awards 
The Zulu Awards is an annual award ceremony established by Denmark's largest commercial TV station TV 2. Volbeat won one award.

|-
| 2008
| Michael Poulsen
| Danish singer of the year
| 
|-
| 2009
| Michael Poulsen
| Danish singer of the year
| 
|}

References

External links 
 Official site

Volbeat
Awards